Tony Killeen (born 9 June 1952) is a former Irish Fianna Fáil politician who served Minister for Defence from 2010 to 2011, Minister of State for Fisheries and Forestry from 2008 to 2010, Minister of State at the Department of the Environment, Heritage and Local Government and at the Department of Communications, Energy and Natural Resources from 2007 to 2008 and Minister of State for Labour Affairs from 2004 to 2007. He served as a Teachta Dála (TD) for the Clare constituency from 1992 to 2011.

Early and personal life
Killeen was born in Corofin, County Clare, and educated at St. Flannan's College in Ennis and Mary Immaculate College in Limerick. He worked as a national school teacher before entering into politics.

He is married to Lily O'Keeffe; they have five sons and live in Kilnaboy, County Clare.

Political career
Killeen first became involved in politics in 1985 when he was elected to Clare County Council and served on that body until 1997. He was chairman from 1989–1991. At the 1992 general election he was elected to Dáil Éireann for the Clare constituency for the first time and retained his seat at each subsequent election until his retirement in 2011.

Killeen has served on a number of committees, including the Joint Oireachtas Committee on Education and Science, the Committee on Procedure and Privileges and the Committee on Members' Interests in Dáil Éireann.

In 2004 he was appointed as Minister of State at the Department of Enterprise, Trade and Employment with special responsibility for Labour Affairs. In June 2007 he was appointed as Minister of State at the Department of the Environment, Heritage and Local Government and at the Department of Communications, Energy and Natural Resources with special responsibility for Environment and Energy. In May 2008, he was appointed as Minister of State at the Department of Agriculture, Fisheries and Food with special responsibility for Fisheries and Forestry.

In January 2007, it emerged that Killeen's office had sent letters to the Minister for Justice, Equality and Law Reform advocating for the early release of a convicted child rapist. Killeen refused to resign as Minister of State.

On 23 March 2010 Taoiseach Brian Cowen appointed Killeen as Minister of Defence replacing Willie O'Dea who had resigned for committing perjury in front of the High Court.

On 6 January 2011, Killeen announced his decision not to contest the 2011 general election, citing medical advice, having been diagnosed with bowel cancer in 2008. He resigned as Minister for Defence on 19 January 2011.

On retirement he received a lump sum of €221,000 and an annual pension of €69,000.

References

1952 births
Living people
Alumni of Mary Immaculate College, Limerick
Fianna Fáil TDs
Irish schoolteachers
Local councillors in County Clare
Members of the 27th Dáil
Members of the 28th Dáil
Members of the 29th Dáil
Members of the 30th Dáil
Ministers for Defence (Ireland)
Ministers of State of the 29th Dáil
Ministers of State of the 30th Dáil
People educated at St Flannan's College
Politicians from County Clare